In Greek and Roman mythology, the Astomi, also known as the Gangines, are an ancient legendary race of people who had no need to eat or drink anything at all. They survived by smelling apples and flowers and perfumes that they sprayed on their victims.

Megasthenes and Pliny the Elder (quoting Megasthenes) mentioned these people in his Indica. Megasthenes located them at the mouth of the river Ganges. In his description, they had rough and hairy bodies and no mouths. When traveling, they would carry roots, flowers and apples to smell. They could die by smelling a strong, unpleasant smell.

Notes

References 

 Pliny the Elder, The Natural History. John Bostock, M.D., F.R.S. H.T. Riley, Esq., B.A. London. Taylor and Francis, Red Lion Court, Fleet Street. 1855. Online version at the Perseus Digital Library.
 Pliny the Elder, Naturalis Historia. Karl Friedrich Theodor Mayhoff. Lipsiae. Teubner. 1906. Latin text available at the Perseus Digital Library.

Greek legendary creatures
Mythic humanoids